Marianne Schieder (born 23 May 1962) is a German politician of the Social Democratic Party (SPD) who has been serving as a member of the Bundestag from the state of Bavaria since 2005.

Political career 
From 1994 to 2004, Schieder was a member of the State Parliament of Bavaria.

Schieder first became a member of the Bundestag in the 2005 German federal election. In parliament, she is a member of the Committee on the Verification of Credentials and Immunities and the Committee on Culture and the Media. She is also a member of the parliament’s Council of Elders, which – among other duties – determines daily legislative agenda items and assigning committee chairpersons based on party representation. 

From 2009 to 2017, Schieder was part of the SPD’s leadership in Bavaria, under its chairman Florian Pronold.

Other activities 
 Haus der Geschichte, Member of the Board of Trustees (since 2022)
 Foundation Flight, Expulsion, Reconciliation, Member of the Board of Trustees
 Memorial to the Murdered Jews of Europe Foundation, Member of the Board of Trustees
 German Catholic Women's Association (KDFB), Member
 German United Services Trade Union (ver.di), Member

References

External links 

  
 Bundestag biography 

1962 births
Living people
Members of the Bundestag for Bavaria
Female members of the Bundestag
21st-century German women politicians
Members of the Bundestag 2021–2025
Members of the Bundestag 2017–2021
Members of the Bundestag 2013–2017
Members of the Bundestag 2009–2013
Members of the Bundestag 2005–2009
Members of the Bundestag for the Social Democratic Party of Germany
People from Schwandorf (district)